Quintunguenu (died 1591) was a Mapuche caudillo, or military leader. He was known for his valor in the assault of Marihuenu in 1591. He died fighting against the Spanish in the mountains of Marihuenu, Chile.

References

16th-century Mapuche people
Chilean military personnel killed in action
Indigenous leaders of the Americas
Indigenous military personnel of the Americas
People of the Arauco War
1591 deaths
16th-century soldiers
Year of birth unknown